The 1901 Lafayette football team was an American football team that represented Lafayette College in the 1901 college football season. In its third season under head coach Samuel B. Newton, the team compiled a 9–3 record and outscored opponents by a total of 240 to 94.

Two of the team's three losses were suffered in games against early professional football teams (Homestead Library & Athletic Club and Philadelphia Athletic Club) made up of all-star rosters.

Schedule

References

Lafayette
Lafayette Leopards football seasons
Lafayette football